Cullen is a town just south of Springhill in northern Webster Parish, Louisiana, United States. The population was 1,163 at the 2010 census. It is part of the Minden Micropolitan Statistical Area.

Bobby Ray Washington, the former mayor of Cullen, served as president and vice president of the Louisiana Municipal Association. He resigned from office when questions arose about his residency in Shreveport. Washington was succeeded in March 2012 by Dexter Turner, a former police detective in Springhill. Turner was elected to a full term as mayor in December 2012 and died on March 22, 2013, of an apparent heart attack at the age of forty-nine.

Cullen has a restored Kansas City Southern Railroad museum located across from the International Paper Company container plant.

In 2011, Ricky L. Thomas reactivated the Ludwig Ball Park, which had been constructed in 1968 for baseball and softball. After many years of neglect the park was restored and a reunion was held in July 2011; all former ball players were invited.  At the reunion Thomas presented Coach Billy Dubois a framed picture of his Louisiana-Arkansas All Star team.  KTBS, the ABC affiliate in Shreveport, aired a story about Ludwig Ball Park.

Charles Jacobs, judge of the Louisiana 26th Judicial District Court since 2015, is a former town attorney for Cullen.

Geography
Cullen is located at  (32.969335, -93.448092).

Demographics

2020 census

As of the 2020 United States census, there were 716 people, 552 households, and 295 families residing in the town.

2000 census
As of the census of 2000, there were 1,296 people, 505 households, and 319 families residing in the town. The racial makeup of the town was 13.35% White, 84.88% African American, 0.46% Native American, 0.08% Asian, 0.08% Pacific Islander, 0.23% from other races, and 0.93% from two or more races. Hispanic or Latino of any race were 0.69% of the population.

There were 505 households, out of which 29.1% had children under the age of 18 living with them, 28.1% were married couples living together, 27.3% had a female householder with no husband present, and 36.8% were non-families. 32.7% of all households were made up of individuals, and 14.5% had someone living alone who was 65 years of age or older. The average household size was 2.57 and the average family size was 3.28.

In the town, the population was spread out, with 30.2% under the age of 18, 8.6% from 18 to 24, 24.5% from 25 to 44, 20.6% from 45 to 64, and 16.2% who were 65 years of age or older. The median age was 36 years. For every 100 females, there were 77.8 males. For every 100 females age 18 and over, there were 66.4 males.

The median income for a household in the town was $15,319, and the median income for a family was $18,854. Males had a median income of $20,368 versus $18,393 for females. The per capita income for the town was $8,307. About 31.3% of families and 39.0% of the population were below the poverty line, including 52.3% of those under age 18 and 30.3% of those age 65 or over.

In 2010, Cullen had the ninth-lowest median household income of all places in the United States with a population over 1,000.

References

Gallery

Towns in Louisiana
Towns in Webster Parish, Louisiana